Hanesbrands Inc. is an American multinational clothing company based in Winston-Salem, North Carolina. It employs 65,300 people internationally. On September 6, 2006, the company and several brands were spun off by the Sara Lee Corporation.

Hanesbrands owns several clothing brands, including Hanes, Champion, Playtex, Bali, L'eggs, Just My Size, Barely There, Wonderbra, Maidenform, Berlei, and Bonds.

History
The original Hanes outlet store was housed in a room adjacent to their factory. Hanesbrands currently operates and owns around 220 Hanesbrands, Maidenform and Champion retail stores across the US. The company's flagship store is located in Winston-Salem, North Carolina and opened in summer 2008. Stores range in size from 2,500 to 17,000 square feet Hanesbrands has companies in various parts of Europe and Eastern Europe, including the United Kingdom, Italy, Germany, France and Spain. Sales revenue for 2010 was $4.33 billion and gross profit was $1.41 billion.

In 2011, WikiLeaks revealed that the corporation had previously lobbied the State Department to prevent the raise of Haiti's minimum-wage to $0.61 an hour from $0.31 an hour.

On July 24, 2013, Hanesbrands agreed to acquire Maidenform for $575 million.

On July 15, 2016, Hanes acquired the Australian-based clothing and underwear and clothing company Pacific Brands

In October 2017, Hanes announced a $60 million acquisition of Norcross, GA based Alternative Apparel.

In 2018, the company opened its first brick-and-mortar Champion brand retail store in Los Angeles. Currently there are 20 Champion stores open. Hanesbrands also has companies in United Kingdom, Italy, Germany, France and Spain.

In November 2019, Chief Financial Officer Barry Hytinen left the company for a position at the storage and information management services company Iron Mountain.

Hanesbrands made a statement in April 2021 that Michael Dastugue will be assuming the role of chief financial officer on May 1. The company has not had a permanent CFO since the departure of Barry Hytinen in 2019, with chief accounting officer Scott Lewis serving as the interim CFO since January 2020. Mr. Dastugue, according to analyst David Swartz of Morningstar Research Services, will be leading the company in adapting to customer preference for online shopping.

See also

 Fruit of the Loom
 Jockey International

References

Further reading

External links
Official site 

Clothing companies of the United States
Clothing companies established in 2006
Companies based in Winston-Salem, North Carolina
Companies listed on the New York Stock Exchange
Hosiery brands
Lingerie brands
Hanes family
Corporate spin-offs
Multinational companies headquartered in the United States